Quality Supermarkets is a Ugandan supermarket chain.

Location
The head office of Quality Supermarket is located at 4 Martin Road, Old Kampala, Kampala Central Division, in the city's central business district.

Overview
The supermarket chain owns and operates four supermarkets in Uganda; all located in Kampala, the capital of Uganda, or its suburbs. Uganda is the third-largest economy in the East African Community. Quality Supermarkets is one of the largest locally-owned supermarket chain in the country. Founded in 1980, the family-owned store chain is managed and operated by the family that founded the store chain.

Branches
 the supermarket chain maintains branches at the following locations:
 Central Kampala - 4 Martin Street, Old Kampala, Kampala
 Lubowa Branch - Quality Shopping Village, Lubowa, Wakiso District
Kitende Branch - Kitende, Entebbe Road
 Naalya Branch - Quality Shopping Mall, Naalya-Kyaliwajjala Road, Naalya, Kira Municipality, Wakiso District.

Ownership
Quality Supermarkets is a wholly Ugandan, privately held company. , the detailed shareholding in the company stock in not widely, publicly known.

See also

References

External links
 Supermarkets Kicking Local Bakeries Out of Business
 The Growth of Supermarkets And Its Implications for Smallholders In Uganda
 Supermarkets Brand Own Products In Search of Bigger Profit Margins
 
Supermarkets of Uganda
Retail companies established in 1980
1980 establishments in Uganda
Companies based in Kampala